Wijayapura Grama Niladhari Division is a  Grama Niladhari Division of the  Kolonnawa Divisional Secretariat  of Colombo District  of Western Province, Sri Lanka .  It has Grama Niladhari Division Code 512D.

Kolonnawa and 2017 Meethotamulla landslide  are located within, nearby or associated with Wijayapura.

Wijayapura is a surrounded by the  Gajabapura, Kolonnawa, Salamulla, Singhapura and Welikada West  Grama Niladhari Divisions.

Demographics

Ethnicity 

The Wijayapura Grama Niladhari Division has  a Sinhalese majority (52.4%) and a significant Moor population (41.7%) . In comparison, the Kolonnawa Divisional Secretariat (which contains the Wijayapura Grama Niladhari Division) has  a Sinhalese majority (67.4%) and a significant Moor population (21.4%)

Religion 

The Wijayapura Grama Niladhari Division has  a Buddhist majority (51.0%) and a significant Muslim population (46.3%) . In comparison, the Kolonnawa Divisional Secretariat (which contains the Wijayapura Grama Niladhari Division) has  a Buddhist majority (64.6%) and a significant Muslim population (23.1%)

References 

Grama Niladhari Divisions of Kolonnawa Divisional Secretariat